Anne Frank (1929–1945) was a young Jewish girl and a German-born diarist.

Anne Frank may also refer to:

Anne Frank: The Biography, a biography of Anne Frank by Melissa Müller
Anne Frank: The Diary of a Young Girl, the diary of Anne Frank
Anne Frank: The Whole Story, a television mini-series about Anne Frank by Robert Dornhelm
5535 Annefrank, an inner main-belt asteroid

See also

Ann Frank Lewis (born 1937), American political strategist